Lokomotivny is a closed urban locality (a work settlement) in Chelyabinsk Oblast, Russia, located  southwest from Chelyabinsk. Population:

Administrative and municipal status
Within the framework of administrative divisions, it is incorporated as the urban-type settlement of oblast significance of Lokomotivny—an administrative unit with the status equal to that of the districts. As a municipal division, the urban-type settlement of oblast significance of Lokomotivny is incorporated as Lokomotivny Urban Okrug.

References

Notes

Sources

Urban-type settlements in Chelyabinsk Oblast
Closed cities

